Barnabus is an unincorporated community in Logan County, West Virginia, United States, along West Virginia Route 44 and Island Creek. Barnabus was named for one of its founding citizens, Barnabus Curry (b. 1789 d. 1869).

References

Unincorporated communities in Logan County, West Virginia
Unincorporated communities in West Virginia